Potassium tetraiodomercurate(II) is an inorganic compound consisting of potassium cations and the tetraiodomercurate(II) anion. It is mainly used as Nessler's reagent, a 0.09 mol/L solution of potassium tetraiodomercurate(II) (K2[HgI4]) in 2.5 mol/L potassium hydroxide, used to detect ammonia.

Preparation and structure
Crystallizing from a concentrated aqueous solution of mercuric iodide with potassium iodide is the monohydrate K2HgI4.H2O, which is pale orange.  In aqueous solution this triodido complex adds iodide to give the tetrahedral tetraiodo dianion.

Solutions of K2HgI4 react with Cu(I) salts to give Cu2HgI4.

Nessler's reagent
Named after Julius Neßler (Nessler), an alkaline solution of K2HgI4 is called Nessler's reagent. This pale solution becomes deeper yellow in the presence of ammonia. At higher concentrations, a brown precipitate may form. The sensitivity as a spot test is about 0.3 μg NH3 in 2 μL.

NH4+ + 2 [HgI4]2− + 4 OH− →   + 7 I− + 3 H2O

The formula for the brown precipitate, a derivative of Millon's base, is given as 3HgO·Hg(NH3)2I2 and as NH2·Hg2I3.

References

External links
IARC Monograph: "Mercury and Mercury Compounds"
National Pollutant Inventory - Mercury and compounds fact sheet

Iodo complexes
Potassium compounds
Mercury(II) compounds
IARC Group 3 carcinogens
Coordination complexes
Chemical tests